The Proclamation of Malaysia (Malay: Pemasyhuran Malaysia Jawi: ڤمشهوران مليسيا) was a statement, written in English and Malay (in the Jawi script), that declared the merger of the Federation of Malaya with the British crown colonies of North Borneo, Sarawak and Singapore into the new Federation of Malaysia, following the enactment of the Malaysia Agreement and the Malaysia Act 1963 that July. The merger came into effect on 16 September 1963, and the proclamation was delivered on that date by Prime Minister Tunku Abdul Rahman in the Stadium Merdeka in Kuala Lumpur.

Draft

English

In the name of God, the Compassionate, the Merciful, Praise to God, the Lord of the Universe, and may the benediction and peace of God be upon Our Leader Muhammad and upon all his Relations and Friends.

WHEREAS by an Agreement made on the Ninth day of July in the year one thousand nine hundred and sixty-three between the Federation of Malaya, the United Kingdom, North Borneo, Sarawak and Singapore it was agreed that there shall be federated the States of Sabah, Sarawak and Singapore with the Federation of Malaya comprising the states of Pahang, Terengganu, Kedah, Johor, Negri Sembilan, Kelantan, Selangor, Perak, Perlis, Penang and Malacca, and that the Federation shall thereafter be called "MALAYSIA":

AND WHEREAS it has been agreed by the parties to the said Agreement that as from the establishment of Malaysia the States of Sabah, Sarawak and Singapore shall cease to be colonies of Her Majesty the Queen and Her Majesty the Queen shall relinquish Her Sovereignty and jurisdiction in respect of the three States:

AND WHEREAS there has been promulgated a Constitution for Malaysia which shall be the supreme law therein:

AND WHEREAS by the Constitution aforesaid provision has been made for the safeguarding of the rights and prerogatives of Their Highnesses the Rulers and the Fundamental rights and liberties of subjects and for the promotion of peace and harmony in Malaysia as a constitutional monarchy based upon parliamentary democracy:

AND WHEREAS the Constitution aforesaid having been approved by a law passed by the Parliaments of the Federation of Malaya and of the United Kingdom has come into force on the Sixteenth day of September in the year one thousand nine hundred and sixty-three.

NOW in the name of God, the Compassionate, the Merciful, I, TUNKU ABDUL RAHMAN PUTRA AL-HAL IBNI ALMARHUM SULTAN ABDUL HAMID HALIM SHAH, Prime Minister of Malaysia, with the concurrence and approval of His Majesty the Yang di-Pertuan Agong of the Federation of Malaya, His Excellency the Yang di-Pertuan Negara of Singapore, His Excellency the Yang di-Pertua Negara of Sabah and His Excellency the Governor of Sarawak, DO HEREBY DECLARE AND PROCLAIM on behalf of the peoples of Malaysia that as from the Sixteenth day of September in the year one thousand nine hundred and sixty-three, corresponding to the twenty-eighth day of Rabi'ul Akhir in the year of the Hijrah one thousand three hundred and eighty-three,

That MALAYSIA comprising the States of Pahang, Trengganu, Kedah, Johore, Negri Sembilan, Kelantan, Selangor, Perak, Perlis, Penang, Malacca, Singapore, Sabah and Sarawak shall by the Grace of God, the Lord of the Universe, forever be an independent and sovereign democratic State founded upon liberty and justice, ever seeking to defend and uphold peace and harmony among its people and to perpetuate peace among nations.

Prime Minister

Kuala Lumpur

16th day of September 1963

Sarawakian proclamation 

The Proclamation of the Sarawak Independence
	 
Whereas one of the Nine Cardinal Principles of the rule of the English Rajahs was that the goal of self-government shall always be kept in mind and that the people of Sarawak shall be entrusted in due course with the Governance of themselves:
	 
And whereas this principle accords with the policy which Her Majesty’s Government of the United Kingdom and Northern Ireland have always pursued in the Governance of those territories of the Commonwealth for those affairs Her Majesty’s Government have been responsible.
	 
And whereas in pursuance of this principle Her Majesty’s Government by an agreement entered into on the 9th day of July, 1963, with the Government of the Federation of Malaya, the Government of the State of Singapore and the Governments of the Colonies of Sarawak and North Borneo it was agreed that the States of Singapore and the Colonies of Sarawak and North Borneo shall be federated with the Federation of Malaya, and that the said Federation shall be known as Malaysia:
	 
And whereas Constitutions for Malaysia and for the States of Sarawak, Sabah and Singapore have been promulgated: And whereas by a Proclamation made under Section 2 of the Malaysia Act the 16th day of September, 1963 has been proclaimed as Malaysia Day:
	 
Now therefore I, Stephen Kalong Ningkan, the Chief Minister of Sarawak, hereby proclaim that Sarawak has this day attained independence as the State of Malaysia.

See also

 Malaysia Agreement
 Malaysia Act 1963
 Malaysia Bill (1963)
 United Nations General Assembly Resolution 1514 (XV)
 United Nations General Assembly Resolution 1541 (XV)
 Proclamation of Singapore

References

External links
 The National Archives of Malaysia - Documents of Proclamation of Malaysia

Formation of Malaysia
Declarations of independence
Government documents
Federalism in Malaysia
Singapore in Malaysia
September 1963 events in Asia
1963 documents
1963 in politics
Malaysia and the Commonwealth of Nations
Singapore and the Commonwealth of Nations